Lillehammer is a municipality in Innlandet county, Norway.

Lillehammer may also refer to:

Places
Lillehammer (town), the administrative centre of Lillehammer Municipality in Innlandet county, Norway
Lillehammer Church, a church in Lillehammer Municipality, Innlandet county, Norway
Lillehammer Hospital, a hospital in Lillehammer Municipality, Innlandet county, Norway
Lillehammer Station, a railway station in Lillehammer Municipality, Innlandet county, Norway

Sport
Lillehammer FK, a Norwegian football club from Lillehammer
Lillehammer SK, a Norwegian skiing (Nordic and alpine) club from Lillehammer
Lillehammer Wolfpack, an American football team based in Lillehammer

Other
Lillehammer affair, the mistaken 1973 killing of Ahmed Bouchikhi by Mossad agents
Lilyhammer, a Norwegian–American crime dramedy television series starring Steven Van Zandt
Hallvard Lillehammer, a professor of philosophy at Birkbeck College, University of London